Uduba is a genus of Malagasy araneomorph spiders in the family Udubidae, first described by Eugène Simon in 1880.

Species 
 it contains thirty-nine species:

 Uduba andriamihajai Griswold, Ubick, Ledford & Polotow, 2022 — Madagascar
 Uduba balsama Griswold, Ubick, Ledford & Polotow, 2022 — Madagascar
 Uduba barbarae Griswold, Ubick, Ledford & Polotow, 2022 — Madagascar
 Uduba dahli Simon, 1903 — Madagascar
 Uduba danielae Griswold, Ubick, Ledford & Polotow, 2022 — Madagascar
 Uduba evanescens (Dahl, 1901) — Madagascar
 Uduba fandroana Griswold, Ubick, Ledford & Polotow, 2022 — Madagascar
 Uduba fisheri Griswold, Ubick, Ledford & Polotow, 2022 — Madagascar
 Uduba funerea Simon, 1906 — Madagascar
 Uduba goodmani Griswold, Ubick, Ledford & Polotow, 2022 — Madagascar
 Uduba hainteny Griswold, Ubick, Ledford & Polotow, 2022 — Madagascar
 Uduba halabe Griswold, Ubick, Ledford & Polotow, 2022 — Madagascar
 Uduba heliani Griswold, Ubick, Ledford & Polotow, 2022 — Madagascar
 Uduba hiragasy Griswold, Ubick, Ledford & Polotow, 2022 — Madagascar
 Uduba ibonia Griswold, Ubick, Ledford & Polotow, 2022 — Madagascar
 Uduba ida Griswold, Ubick, Ledford & Polotow, 2022 — Madagascar
 Uduba irwini Griswold, Ubick, Ledford & Polotow, 2022 — Madagascar
 Uduba jayjay Griswold, Ubick, Ledford & Polotow, 2022 — Madagascar
 Uduba kavanaughi Griswold, Ubick, Ledford & Polotow, 2022 — Madagascar
 Uduba lakroa Griswold, Ubick, Ledford & Polotow, 2022 — Madagascar
 Uduba lamba Griswold, Ubick, Ledford & Polotow, 2022 — Madagascar
 Uduba lavitra Griswold, Ubick, Ledford & Polotow, 2022 — Madagascar
 Uduba lehibekokoa Griswold, Ubick, Ledford & Polotow, 2022 — Madagascar
 Uduba madagascariensis (Vinson, 1863) — Madagascar
 Uduba milamina Griswold, Ubick, Ledford & Polotow, 2022 — Madagascar
 Uduba orona Griswold, Ubick, Ledford & Polotow, 2022 — Madagascar
 Uduba platnicki Griswold, Ubick, Ledford & Polotow, 2022 — Madagascar
 Uduba pseudoevanescens Griswold, Ubick, Ledford & Polotow, 2022 — Madagascar
 Uduba rajery Griswold, Ubick, Ledford & Polotow, 2022 — Madagascar
 Uduba rakotofrah Griswold, Ubick, Ledford & Polotow, 2022 — Madagascar
 Uduba rakotozafy Griswold, Ubick, Ledford & Polotow, 2022 — Madagascar
 Uduba rinha Griswold, Ubick, Ledford & Polotow, 2022 — Madagascar
 Uduba salegy Griswold, Ubick, Ledford & Polotow, 2022 — Madagascar
 Uduba sarotra Griswold, Ubick, Ledford & Polotow, 2022 — Madagascar
 Uduba schlingeri Griswold, Ubick, Ledford & Polotow, 2022 — Madagascar
 Uduba taralily Griswold, Ubick, Ledford & Polotow, 2022 — Madagascar
 Uduba valiha Griswold, Ubick, Ledford & Polotow, 2022 — Madagascar
 Uduba volana Griswold, Ubick, Ledford & Polotow, 2022 — Madagascar
 Uduba woodae Griswold, Ubick, Ledford & Polotow, 2022 — Madagascar

References

Araneomorphae genera
Udubidae